The APW Worldwide Internet Championship is a professional wrestling championship created and promoted by the independent professional wrestling promotion All Pro Wrestling.

Title history 
Michael Modest was the inaugural champion. Rik Luxury has the most reigns with five. Levi Shapiro's current and ongoing reign is the longest at + days, while Tito Aquino's reign is the shortest at 1 hour.

Levi Shapiro is the current champion in his first reign. He defeated Will Hobbs at Bay Area Bash on June 15, 2019, in Daly City, CA.

Combined reigns

See also
APW Tag Team Championship
APW Universal Heavyweight Championship

References

External links
APW World Wide Internet Championship History on Solie.org
  APW Worldwide Internet Title History at Cagematch.net

All Pro Wrestling championships
Television wrestling championships